OutHistory.org is a website about lesbian, gay, bisexual, transgender, queer, and heterosexual history, and, more generally, gender and sexual history. OutHistory.org comprises elements of an almanac, archive, article, bibliography, book, encyclopedia, library, and museum.

OutHistory.org was produced in its first four years by the Center for Lesbian and Gay Studies (CLAGS), located at the City University of New York Graduate Center. OutHistory.org is produced by University of Illinois at Chicago, under the direction of John D'Emilio. OutHistory.org has collaborated with other LGBTQ history sites, archives, newspapers, magazines, museum projects, and art galleries, as well as interested researchers. The site collaborates with The Windy City Times and ChicagoGayHistory.org. OutHistory.org has also partnered with the Arcus Foundation to award recipients of the LGBTQ Local Histories Contest for excellent contributions to OutHistory.org on local history topics.

The site was founded and is co-directed by Jonathan Ned Katz. The site was designed originally by Cidamon, a New York-based web design and development company, using open-source MediaWiki software. The content of OutHistory.org is provided by volunteers. While the site went live in 2004, the official launch of the current OutHistory.org took place October 21, 2008.

OutHistory.org was awarded the 2010 Allan Berube Prize in Public History by the Committee on LGBT History of the American Historical Association.

References

External links

Internet properties established in 2004
Wiki communities
LGBT organizations in the United States
History websites of the United States